The 2017 Miami FC season was the club's second season of existence, and second season playing in the North American Soccer League. During the season Miami won both the Spring and Fall NASL season, qualifying for the end of season playoffs where they would go out on penalties to the New York Cosmos in the Semifinals. In the U.S. Open Cup, Miami reached the Quarterfinals before losing to USL side FC Cincinnati 0-1 in a game that had to be re-arranged due to bad weather. Stefano ended the season as the club's top goalscorer with 21 goals across all competitions, 17 coming in the NASL.

Roster

Staff
  Mauro Pederzoli – Technical Director
  Federico Bertele' - Assistant Technical Director
  Alessandro Nesta – Head Coach
  Lorenzo Rubinacci – Assistant coach
  Vincenzo Benvenuto – Goalkeeper coach
  Paolo Pacione – Head of Performance and Fitness Coach

Transfers

Winter

In:

Out:

Summer

In:

Out:

Friendlies

Competitions

NASL Spring season

Standings

Results summary

Results by round

Matches

NASL Fall season

Standings

Results summary

Results by round

Matches

NASL Playoff

U.S. Open Cup

Squad statistics

Appearances and goals

|-
|colspan="14"|Players who left Miami FC during the season:
|}

Goal scorers

Disciplinary record

References

External links
 

Miami FC seasons
American soccer clubs 2017 season
2017 in sports in Florida
2017 North American Soccer League season